Jet Set is the fourth and last single from Alphaville's first album, Forever Young, and was released in March 1985.

Re-recorded and released after founding band member Frank Mertens left the band, the 7" version drops the word 'The' from the song's title and is mildly different from the original album version.

Marian Gold said of the song, "We didn't intend to write a proper song; it was supposed to be some kind of jingle that advertises things money can't buy: anarchy, freedom, love, fun and a piece of the end of the world."

Track listings
 7" single
 "Jet Set (7" version)" — 3:40
 "Golden Feeling" — 3:50

 12" single
 "Jet Set (Jellybean mix)" — 6:28
 "Jet Set (Dub mix)" — 5:07
 "Golden Feeling" — 3:50

 Promotional 12" single
 "Jet Set (Vocal/Jellybean mix)" - 6:28
 "Jet Set (Dub mix)" - 5:05

 The "Vocal/Jellybean Mix" on the promotional 12" is identical to the regular 12" single's "Jellybean" mix
 A demo of the B-side "Golden Feeling" appeared on 1999's Dreamscapes

Charts

Other releases
Versions of this song have appeared on a variety of other Alphaville releases, including:
 Dreamscapes (demos and live)
 Forever Pop (remix)
 Little America (live)
 First Harvest 1984-92 (remix)

The original 12" version and the b-side "Golden Feeling" were both released on 2014's so80s presents Alphaville.

Notes

Alphaville (band) songs
1985 singles
Songs written by Marian Gold
Songs written by Bernhard Lloyd
Songs written by Frank Mertens
Atlantic Records singles
Warner Music Group singles
1984 songs